Lekmarje is a small dispersed settlement in the northern part of the Kozje region in eastern Slovenia. It lies in the Municipality of Šmarje pri Jelšah in the traditional region of Styria. The municipality is now included in the Savinja Statistical Region.

References

External links
Lekmarje at Geopedia

Populated places in the Municipality of Šmarje pri Jelšah